Antiville is an unincorporated community in Bearcreek Township, Jay County, Indiana.

A post office was established at Antiville in 1889, and remained in operation until it was discontinued in 1900.

Geography

References

Unincorporated communities in Jay County, Indiana
Unincorporated communities in Indiana